The Bodil Award for Best Cinematographer is one of the special awards at the annual Danish Bodil Awards presented by the Danish Film Critics Association. First awarded in 2006, the Danish Film Critics Association has rewarded cinematographer from as early as 1949.

History 
When the Bodil Awards started out in 1948, it only had seven categories: Best Danish Film, Best Leading Actress, Best Leading Actor, Best Supporting Actress, Best Supporting Actor, Best European Film, and Best American Film. Already at the 2nd Bodil Awards in 1949, the limitations of the seven categories became apparent, and the Bodil Honorary Award was instigated.

From 2000 to 2005 (barring 2003), an external, named cinematographer prize without a Bodil statuette was awarded under three different names: Johan Ankerstjernes Fotografpris (Johan Ankerstjerne's Cinematographer Award) (2000–2002) named after Johan Ankerstjerne, Kodak og Nordisk Postproductions Fotografpris (Kodak and Nordic Postproduction's Cinematographer Award) in 2004, and Nordisk Film Lab og Kodaks Fotografpris (Nordic Film Lab and Kodak Cinematographer Award) in 2005.
 2000:  for  – as Johan Ankerstjernes Fotografpris
 2001: Eric Kress for A Place Nearby – as Johan Ankerstjernes Fotografpris
 2002: Dan Laustsen – as Johan Ankerstjernes Fotografpris
 2003: No award given
 2004: Anthony Dod Mantle – as Kodak og Nordisk Postproductions Fotografpris
 2005:  – as Nordisk Film Lab og Kodaks Fotografpris

Since 2006, the Bodil Award for Best Cinematographer has been awarded annually as a special award with a Bodil statuette. As such, the award was given for the first time at the 59th Bodil Awards in 2006 to Manuel Alberto Claro.

Recipients

2000s 
 2006: Manuel Alberto Claro for Allegro and Dark Horse
 2007:  for Prague
 2008: Dan Laustsen
 2009:  for Terribly Happy (2008) and Flame & Citron (2008)

2010s 
 2010: Anthony Dod Mantle for Antichrist
 2011:  for Armadillo
 2012: Manuel Alberto Claro for Melancholia
 2013: Rasmus Videbæk for A Royal Affair
 2014: Charlotte Bruus Christensen for The Hunt
 2015: Niels Thastum for When Animals Dream
 2016: Magnus Nordenhof Jønck for Key House Mirror, Bridgend, and A War
 2017:  for Parents
 2018: Maria von Hausswolff for Winter Brothers
 :  for Holiday

2020s 
 2020:  for Queen of Hearts (2019 film)
 : Louise McLaughlin for

See also 

 Robert Award for Best Cinematography

References

Sources

Further reading

External links 
 Best Cinematographer award in Bodil Awards 

2006 establishments in Denmark
Awards established in 2006
Awards for best cinematography
Cinematographer